The Edmonton Grays was Edmonton, Alberta's second baseball team.  They played in the Western Canada League starting in 1907. The Grays won a championship in 1909. 

They were the successor to the Edmonton Legislatures, who were the city's first team, formed in 1884.

Defunct minor league baseball teams
Defunct baseball teams in Canada
Gra